Rae Anderson (born 8 April 1953) is a former Australian professional squash player.

Anderson was born on 8 April 1953 and  started playing tennis before turning to squash in 1974 in Ringwood, Melbourne. She was a world's top ten player and represented Australia in the 1981 World Team Squash Championships.

References

External links
 

Australian female squash players
Living people
1953 births